Janina Miščiukaitė School of Art is a public art school in Jonava, Lithuania. Founded in 1965 as a music school, it added applied arts classes in 1982, choreography in 1992 and drama studies in 1993. In 1990, the school was relocated to the old town of Jonava. In 1994, the school received the status of an art school status and was renamed after Janina Miščiukaitė in 2009.

References

External links 
Official website

Art schools in Lithuania
Educational institutions established in 1965
Schools in Jonava
1965 establishments in the Soviet Union
Schools in the Soviet Union